" ('Long live free Quebec!') was a phrase in a speech delivered by French President Charles de Gaulle in Montreal, Quebec on July 24, 1967, during an official visit to Canada for the Expo 67 world's fair. While giving an address to a large crowd from a balcony at Montreal City Hall, he uttered  ("Long live Montreal, Long live Quebec!") and then added, followed by loud applause,  ("Long live free Quebec!") with particular emphasis on the word . The phrase, a slogan used by Quebecers who favoured Quebec sovereignty, was seen as giving his support to the movement. The speech caused a diplomatic incident with the Government of Canada and was condemned by Canadian Prime Minister Lester B. Pearson, saying that "Canadians do not need to be liberated". In France, though many were sympathetic to the cause of Quebec nationalism, De Gaulle's speech was criticized as a breach of protocol.

Background

Even before his arrival, the Canadian federal government had been concerned about President de Gaulle's visit. Earlier that year, the French government had not sent a high-level representative to the funeral service for Governor General Georges Vanier. This attracted notice in Canada, as Vanier and his wife, Pauline, had been personal friends of de Gaulle since 1940, when the latter was in exile in London, England. In April, de Gaulle did not attend the 50th anniversary ceremonies commemorating the Canadian victory at Vimy Ridge. So worried was the Pearson government about potential interference of France in domestic affairs that Secretary of State for External Affairs, Paul Martin, was dispatched to visit de Gaulle in Paris to mend the two countries' relationship. The Montreal Gazette speculated, 45 years after the incident, that de Gaulle was still annoyed over a perceived slight from World War II-era Canadian Prime Minister Mackenzie King's slow recognition of the new French government in late summer 1944.

In the spring of 1966, as part of the Expo 67 diplomatic protocols, de Gaulle and all world leaders whose countries had an exhibit at the fair were invited to visit Canada during the spring and summer of 1967. A few months later, de Gaulle was also sent a separate invitation to visit Quebec by Quebec premier Daniel Johnson. De Gaulle, as a visiting head of state, should have arrived in the Canadian capital of Ottawa, as would be conventional protocol. Instead, he took the time to sail on the French navy's Mediterranean flagship, the cruiser Colbert, so that he could arrive in Quebec City, the capital city of the province of Quebec. There, de Gaulle was cheered enthusiastically, while the new governor general, Roland Michener, was booed by the same crowd when viceregal salute was played at his arrival. In his speech, de Gaulle spoke of his country's "evolving" ties with Quebec, hinting at his support for Quebec sovereignty.

Speech

On July 15, before boarding the Colbert, de Gaulle told Xavier Deniau: "They will hear me over there, it will make waves!" He also confided to his son-in-law General Alain de Boissieu that: "I am going to strike a strong blow. Things are going to get hot. But it is necessary. It is the last chance to rectify the cowardice of France." De Gaulle was referring to what he viewed as France's abandonment of 70,000 French colonists after France was defeated in the North American theatre of the Seven Years' War in 1763.

On July 24, de Gaulle arrived in Montreal and was driven up the Chemin du Roy to Montreal City Hall, where Mayor Jean Drapeau and Premier Johnson waited. De Gaulle was not scheduled to speak that evening, but the crowd chanted for him; he told Drapeau: "I have to speak to those people who are calling for me". According to a number of personal interviews with high-ranking French officials, as well as documents he uncovered,  scholar Dale C. Thomson wrote that de Gaulle's statement was planned, and that he used it when the opportunity presented itself.

De Gaulle stepped out onto the balcony to give a short address to the assembled masses which was also broadcast live on radio. In his speech he commented that his drive down the banks of the Saint Lawrence River, lined as it had been with cheering crowds, reminded him of his triumphant return to Paris after the liberation from Nazi Germany. The speech appeared to conclude with the words  ("Long live Montreal! Long live Quebec!"), but he then added,  ("Long live free Quebec! Long live, long live, long live French Canada! And long live France!"), whereupon the crowd roared with approval, especially after hearing, .

Reaction

This statement, coming from the French head of state, was considered a serious breach of diplomatic protocol. It emboldened the Quebec sovereignty movement, and produced tensions between the leadership of the two countries. The crowd's reaction to De Gaulle's phrase was emotional and it sparked controversy with many English Canadians afterwards, as they were outraged at the implied threat to Canada's territorial integrity. Canadian Prime Minister Lester B. Pearson rebuked de Gaulle with an official statement, delivered to the French Embassy on July 25, and read on national television that evening.  He said "The people of Canada are free. Every province in Canada is free. Canadians do not need to be liberated. Indeed, many thousands of Canadians gave their lives in two world wars in the liberation of France and other European countries."

A media and diplomatic uproar ensued thereafter, which resulted in de Gaulle cutting short his visit to Canada. The day after the speech, de Gaulle visited Expo 67 and hosted a banquet at the French pavilion. On July 26, instead of continuing his visit on to Ottawa, where he was scheduled to meet with Prime Minister Pearson, he decided to return to France on a French military jet.

The newly appointed Canadian Minister of Justice, Pierre Trudeau, publicly wondered what the French reaction would have been if a Canadian Prime Minister shouted, "Brittany to the Bretons".  From then on, de Gaulle remained unimpressed by Trudeau, saying   ("We have not one concession, nor even any courtesy, to extend to Mr. Trudeau, who is the adversary of the 'French fact' in Canada.") De Gaulle was also heavily criticized by a large part of the French media for his breach of international protocol, in particular by Le Monde.

Meanwhile, to members of the Quebec sovereignty movement, the speech was viewed as a watershed moment. Occurring soon after the Quiet Revolution, and taking into account the low economic and political state of French Canadians at the time, the support of a foreign head of state seemed to add credibility to the movement in the eyes of many, including future Quebec premier René Lévesque.

On the flight home from Montreal, de Gaulle told René de Saint-Légier de la Saussaye—his diplomatic counsellor—that the event was "a historical phenomenon that was perhaps foreseeable but it took a form that only the situation itself could determine. Of course, like many others I could have got away with a few polite remarks or diplomatic acrobatics, but when one is General De Gaulle, one does not have recourse to such expedients. What I did, I had to do it."

In 1969, de Gaulle visited Brittany, during which, in Quimper, he declaimed a poem written by his uncle (also called Charles de Gaulle) in the Breton language, expressing devotion to Breton culture. The speech, well received by the crowd, followed a series of crackdowns on Breton nationalism. He was accused of double standards for, on the one hand demanding a free Quebec, while on the other oppressing the movement in Brittany. During this Quimper speech, he replied to this criticism that Brittany was free and had been freed by Bretons and other French forces during the Liberation, reminding them that the Resistance was more intense in Brittany than in any other part of France, and that many Bretons had joined the Free French Forces.

See also

 Gaullism
 History of Quebec
 List of speeches
 Rassemblement pour l'Indépendance Nationale

References

Bibliography

External links
Video of the whole speech on SRC.ca
Longer video of the visit, starting with the arrival of the "Colbert"
De Gaulle and Quebec 

Charles de Gaulle
Speeches by heads of state
1967 in Canadian politics
French words and phrases
Quebec political phrases
Canada–France relations
International incidents
1967 in international relations
1967 in Quebec
1967 speeches
Quebec sovereignty movement